Shelley Lynn Thornton (born June 2, 1970) is the biological daughter of Norma McCorvey. Also referred to by the pseudonym "Roe Baby", Thornton is the child at the center of the 1973 U.S. Supreme Court decision, Roe v. Wade. Her identity was not publicly known until 2021.

Life 
Shelley Lynn Thornton was born to Norma McCorvey on June 2, 1970, at the Dallas Osteopathic Hospital. At three days old, she was adopted by then-engaged Texas residents, Ruth Schmidt and Billy Thornton.  Shelley Lynn Thornton was two-and-a-half years old when the Roe v. Wade ruling was issued. She graduated from Highline High School in 1988 and entered secretarial school. Her birth mother first made contact with Thornton in 1989 when she was a teenager living near Seattle. 

Thornton married her boyfriend, Doug, of Albuquerque, New Mexico, in March 1991; they had a son later that year. She later had two daughters, one in 1999 and another in 2000, and moved to Tucson, Arizona, for her husband's job. Thornton met her biological half-sisters, McCorvey's two other daughters, in March 2013. Thornton never met her birth mother, although they had several telephone conversations.

In 2021, Thornton's identity as the "Roe baby" was released in Joshua Prager's book, The Family Roe: An American Story.

Discovery of Roe v. Wade connection 
Thornton was McCorvey's third child. Although McCorvey had sought an abortion, she was prohibited from doing so by the laws in Texas at that time.  McCorvey eventually brought, and won, a lawsuit, securing for women the constitutional right to an abortion. Despite McCorvey's desire to abort the fetus, Thornton was not aborted as a fetus, because the court proceedings in Roe v. Wade took too long. 

Many years later, after Thornton learned of her identity as the "Roe baby", she engaged in telephone conversations with McCorvey. McCorvey told Shelley Thornton that she was placed for adoption because, Shelley recalled, "I knew I couldn't take care of you." When Thornton asked McCorvey about her biological father, McCorvey said little: she told Thornton that his first name was Bill and she described what he looked like.  Thornton also learned about her two older half-sisters from McCorvey, Melissa and Jennifer.

In a 2021 interview, Thornton stated that she was not pro-choice or pro-life. She grew up not knowing that she was the fetus in the Roe case until her birth mother appeared on the Today show in 1989 and talked about her desire to meet her daughter. In response, a journalist for the National Enquirer found Thornton as a teenager and told her about her prenatal history, which made her sad. In 1991, Thornton became pregnant and did not have an abortion because abortion was "not part of who I was". By 2021, she had met her two half-siblings but not her birth mother. She nearly met her birth mother in 1994; according to Thornton, McCorvey told her on the phone that she should have thanked her for not having an abortion. Thornton's reaction was "What! I'm supposed to thank you for getting knocked up... and then giving me away?" She told her birth mother that she "would never, ever thank her for not aborting me". She reflected, "When someone's pregnant with a baby, and they don't want that baby, that person develops knowing they're not wanted."

Reversal of Roe 
In 2022, the U.S. Supreme Court decided another abortion case, Dobbs v. Jackson Women's Health Organization. In Dobbs, the Court explicitly overruled Roe. Thornton released a statement speaking out against the Supreme Court's decision to overturn the 1973 landmark Roe case. In a statement to ABC News, Thornton indicated that she worries the Dobbs ruling could be an omen for future unrest. She told ABC News through her spokesperson, "Too many times has a woman's choice, voice, and individual freedom been decided for her by others. Being that I am bound to the center of Roe v. Wade, I have a unique perspective on this matter specifically." She added, "I believe that the decision to have an abortion is a private, medical choice that should be between a woman, her family, and her doctor. We have lived in times of uncertainty and insecurity before, but to have such a fundamental right taken away and this ruling be overturned concerns me of what lies ahead."

References

External links 

 Daughter of 'Jane Roe', the woman behind the landmark abortion case, comes to terms with her identity
 Daughter of Jane Roe Has 'No Regrets' About Never Meeting Her Birth Mother After Landmark Abortion Case

1970 births
American adoptees
American children
Highline High School alumni
Living people
People from Dallas